Akhtubinsk is a town and the administrative center of Akhtubinsky District in Astrakhan Oblast, Russia, located on the left bank of the Akhtuba River (a tributary of the Volga),  north of Astrakhan, the administrative center of the oblast. Population:  45,542 (2002 Census);  30,000 (1968).

History
It was founded in 1959 by the merger of three settlements: Vladimirovka, Petropavlovskoye, and Akhtuba.

Administrative and municipal status
Within the framework of administrative divisions, Akhtubinsk serves as the administrative center of Akhtubinsky District. As an administrative division, it is, together with five rural localities, incorporated within Akhtubinsky District as the town of district significance of Akhtubinsk. As a municipal division, the town of district significance of Akhtubinsk is incorporated within Akhtubinsky Municipal District as Akhtubinsk Urban Settlement.

Economy
The major enterprises in the town include a shipbuilding and repair plant, a milk factory, a meat factory, a bakery, and a mineral water plant.

Akhtubinsk is the transfer point for Bassol, the industrial complex which extracts salt from Lake Baskunchak.

Transportation
The Volgograd–Astrakhan road passes through Akhtubinsk.

Vladimirovka and Akhtuba railway stations on the Volgograd-Verkhny Baskunchak railway branch
Vladimirovskaya Quay terminal
a cargo port on the Akhtuba River
a military airbase (Akhtubinsk (air base))

Military
A state flight testing center known as Valery Chkalov 929 GLITs VVS is located in Akhtubinsk. The Groshevo (Vladimirovka) military testing range is located to the north of Akhtubinsk.

In 2012 construction of a site for flight test operations began, including new runway specifically designed to accommodate flight testing of the Sukhoi Su-57 stealth fighter currently under development.

References

Sources

External links
 
Official website of Akhtubinsk 
Directory of organizations in Akhtubinsk 

Cities and towns in Astrakhan Oblast
Populated places established in 1959